HR 8799 d is an extrasolar planet located approximately 129 light-years away in the constellation of Pegasus, orbiting the 6th magnitude Lambda Boötis star HR 8799.  It has a mass between 5 and 10 Jupiter masses and a radius from 20 to 30% larger than Jupiter's.   The planet orbits at 24 AU from HR 8799 with an eccentricity greater than 0.04 and a period of 100 years.  Upon initial discovery, it was the innermost known planet in the HR 8799 system, but e, discovered later, is now known to be closer to their parent star.  Along with two other planets orbiting HR 8799, this planet was discovered on November 13, 2008 by Marois et al., using the Keck and Gemini observatories in Hawaii. These planets were discovered using the direct imaging technique.

Near infrared spectroscopy from 995 to 1769 nanometers made with the Palomar Observatory show evidence of Acetylene, Methane, and Carbon Dioxide, but Ammonia is not definitively detected. In 2021, the further detection of Water and Carbon Monoxide in the planetary atmosphere was made with the Keck Planet Imager and Characterizer (KPIC).



See also
 Fomalhaut b

Notes

References

External links

 

HR 8799
Exoplanets discovered in 2008
Giant planets
Pegasus (constellation)
Exoplanets detected by direct imaging